Shakaradara is a village in Kohat district, Khyber Pakhtunkhwa, Pakistan. It is renowned for its oil and gas reservoirs.

Postal Code: 26380

Controversy 
A petition, seeking to end the gas supply to Punjab, was registered in the Peshawar High Court. PHC has left the matter into the hands of the government and its negotiations with the Oil and Gas Development Company Limited, and Sui Northern Gas Pipelines Pakistan.

Climate 
Shakadara has a very hot climate in summers and cold in winters with the hottest months being May, June, July, and August. In summer, the temperature reaches 40 degrees Celsius and above but the weather changes from October through February. The winter season is, however, very pleasant and frigid. Monsoon rains are received from May to October with August being the rainiest month. The rain season in winter lasts from November to April.

Languages 
Pashto is the common language that is locally understood and spoken. Urdu is the national language is also understood. The most notable tribe is Khattak with its sub-tribes as, Saghri Khattak, Bangi-Khel Khattak, and Buraq Khattak.

References

External links 
 Shakardara Pakistan 

 Populated places in Kohat District